Classroom of the Elite is a Japanese anime series based on the light novel of the same name written by Shōgo Kinugasa and illustrated by Shunsaku Tomose. An anime television series adaptation was announced and aired from July 12 to September 27, 2017 on AT-X and other channels. Seiji Kishi and Hiroyuki Hashimoto directed the anime at Lerche. Aoi Akashiro handled the series composition, Kazuaki Morita designed the characters, and Ryo Takahashi composed the music. The opening theme "Caste Room" is performed by ZAQ, and the ending theme "Beautiful Soldier" is performed by Minami. Crunchyroll streamed the series with subtitles, while Funimation streamed the English dub.

On February 21, 2022, it was announced that a sequel was in production. The sequel was later revealed to be two additional seasons which would be produced in a studio. The second season is directed by Yoshihito Nishōji, with Kishi and Hashimoto returning as chief directors, Hayato Kazano replacing Akashiro as the scriptwriter, and Morita returning as the character designer. Masaru Yokoyama and Kana Hashiguchi are composing the music, replacing Takahashi. The second season aired from July 4 to September 26, 2022. The opening theme "Dance in the Game" is performed by ZAQ, and the ending theme "Hito Jibai" is performed by Mai Fuchigami. The third season will premiere in 2023.

Series overview

Episode list

Season 1 (2017)

Season 2 (2022)

Notes

Title's Quotes

References

 
Classroom of the Elite